Sverrir Gudnason (born 12 September 1978; in Icelandic: Sverrir Páll Guðnason) is a Swedish actor of Icelandic origin.

Gudnason was born in Lund, Sweden, and raised in Reykjavík, Iceland. He moved with his family to Tyresö, Sweden, in 1990 when his father found work as a professor at the Royal Institute of Technology. At the 2009 Shanghai International Film Festival, he received an award for Best Actor for his role in the Swedish/Danish film Original. He has since played the role of Pontus Höijer in the second series of Wallander as well as leading roles in productions at both Gothenburg's and Stockholm's city theaters.

He was cast as Björn Borg in the 2017 film Borg vs McEnroe. In 2018, he played Mikael Blomkvist in the thriller The Girl in the Spider's Web. In the 2020 film Falling which was written, directed and played in by Viggo Mortensen, Gudnason plays the role of the caustically misogynist father as a difficult young family man in the flashback scenes.

Filmography

Film

Television

References

External links
 
 

1978 births
21st-century Swedish male actors
Best Actor Guldbagge Award winners
Best Supporting Actor Guldbagge Award winners
Living people
People from Lund
Swedish male film actors
Swedish male stage actors
Swedish male television actors
Swedish people of Icelandic descent